Poseidon is a 2011 South Korean action television series starring Choi Siwon, Lee Si-young, Lee Sung-jae, Han Jung-soo, Jung Woon-taek and Kil Yong-woo. It aired on KBS2 from September 19 to November 8, 2011, on Mondays and Tuesdays at 21:55 for 16 episodes.

The drama revolves around the duties of Korean Coast Guard officers on rescues, terrorism threats, and other special missions; and their obstacles in life and love. It takes its name from the Poseidon Team, a special forces unit of the Marines.

Plot
A worldwide criminal syndicate known as Heugsahoe exists. Their boss is Choi Hee-gon.

In 2008, the leader of the Intelligence Investigation Team of the Maritime Police, Kwon Jung-ryool (Lee Sung-jae), forms a secret investigation team to capture crime boss Choi Hee-gon. As Jung-ryool gets closer and closer to capturing Choi Hee-gon, Jung-ryool's wife Min-jung suddenly goes missing. Her dead body is then thrown in front of Jung-ryool. Soon after, other family members involved in the undercover operation are killed.

Sun-woo (Choi Siwon) goes undercover on Jung-ryool's orders. Sun-woo can't stop the mission, even though there's continuous threats on his life. Soon, a policewoman who investigates Sun-woo is killed. It's clear that the woman's murder was committed by crime boss Choi Hee-gon, but evidence is still lacking for his arrest. Finally, the undercover operation is abandoned.

3 years later, Jung-ryool appears obsessed with his job, trying to forget the guilt he feels over the death of his wife. With the help of Hyun Hye-jung (Jin Hee-kyung) and a director of the maritime police, Jung-ryool forms another special investigation team. To avoid the attention of others inside the maritime police and crime boss Choi Hee-gon, the special investigation team is disguised as the #9 investigation team which is responsible for unsolved cases.

Sun-woo has been demoted to the country maritime police office in Gunsan City. There, Sun-woo busts an illegal trafficking organization and runs off with their smuggled goods. Sun-woo now becomes a fugitive. This was part of Jung-ryool and Sun-woo's plan to catch Choi Hee-gon. They hope to go through middle man Jung Deok-soo, nicknamed Popeye. Sun-woo approaches Popeye with his stolen goods, but Popeye finds out the truth. Luckily, Sun-woo is saved with the help of tactical team leader Kang Eun-chul (Yunho), his former colleague.

Sun-woo now joins the #9 investigation team. Sun-woo also takes an interest in Corporal Soo-yoon (Lee Si-young). Meanwhile, Popeye kidnaps Kang Eun-chul (Yunho). The abduction of Kang Eun-chul brings back memories of the slain police officer several years earlier.

Cast

 Choi Si-won as Kim Sun-woo 
 Lee Si-young as Lee Soo-yoon
 Lee Sung-jae as Kwon Jung-ryool
 Han Jung-soo as Oh Min-hyuk
 Jung Woon-taek as Lee Choong-shik
 Jang Dong-jik as Kang Joo-min
 Jung Yun-ho as Kang Eun-chul 
 Uhm Do-hyun as young Kang Eun-chul
 Jin Hee-kyung as Hyun Hye-jung
 Lee Byung-joon as Police superintendent Gu
 Son Jong-bum as Captain Oh
 Park Sung-kwang as Kim Dae-sung
 Lee Sang-hoon as Lee Won-tak
 Lee Joo-shil as Cha Myung-joo
 Kim Soo-hyun as Kwon Ha-na
 Jeon Mi-seon as Park Min-jung 
 Park Won-sook as Uhm Hee-sook
 Kil Yong-woo as Oh Yong-gap
 Im Ki-hyuk as Kim Sang-soo
 Kim Tae-hyung as Woo Hyun-tae
 Kim Yoon-seo as Hong Ji-ah
 Kim Joon-bae as Jung Deok-soo ("Popeye")
 Jang Won-young as Ahn Dong-chool
 Lee Dong-shin as Kwon Chang-bum
 Choi Jung-woo as Han Sang-goon
 Lee Han-sol as Chang-gil
 Jung Ho-bin as Jung Do-young 
 Jang Yong as Yoo Young-gook
 Choi Ran as Young-ran
 Kim Sun-kyung as Go Na-kyung 
 Im Seung-dae as Kim Joo-hyung
 Moon Joon-young as Cha Hyun-seung
 Cha Ki-joo as Moo-young
 Kim Seung-pil as safety management employee
 Bae Jin-sub as Moon Seung-chan
 Hyun Chul-ho as Section chief Seo
 Jung Joo-ri

Production
The drama was originally set for broadcast on SBS during the first half of 2011, starring Eric Mun and Kim Ok-bin in the roles of Kim Sun-woo and Lee Soo-yoon, respectively. However they dropped out when production was halted after the Bombardment of Yeonpyeong incident in November 2010. Production company Annex Telecom transferred to a different network KBS, and filming resumed in August 2011 with the casting of Choi Siwon and Lee Si-young.

Ratings

Source: TNmS Media Korea

International broadcast
The series was sold to seven countries in Asia, including Japan, China and Taiwan.

It aired on Mnet Japan beginning December 14, 2011.

References

External links
  
 
 

2011 South Korean television series debuts
2011 South Korean television series endings
Korean Broadcasting System television dramas
Korean-language television shows
South Korean action television series
South Korean romance television series